Aglossa subpurpuralis is a species of snout moth in the genus Aglossa. It was described by Pierre Chrétien in 1915 and is known from Tunisia.

References

Moths described in 1915
Pyralini
Endemic fauna of Tunisia
Moths of Africa